Brett Eriksen was a guitarist who played for two Los Angeles thrash metal bands in the 1980s, Viking  (1986–1990) and Dark Angel (1990–1992).

Viking era
He formed Viking in the spring of 1986 with Ron Eriksen (who was not his brother, they used the surname only for stage purposes). Viking managed to land a recording contract upon the completion of their second live concert, a feat practically unheard of in the clubs of Hollywood. After two records, Do or Die (1988) and Man of Straw (1989), they disbanded. When Viking reformed in 2011, Eriksen did not participate.

Dark Angel era
He had been friends with Gene Hoglan and the other Dark Angel members ever since the band shared the same stage back in the late 1980s when he played for Viking. When Viking finished recording their second album Man of Straw, Brett Eriksen became a temporary replacement for Dark Angel's Jim Durkin somewhere the east coast during the Leave Scars tour. From this tour, Dark Angel released the live album Live Scars (which also featured Viking's Ron Eriksen as a guest vocalist). When Viking disbanded, Brett joined Dark Angel full-time. In 1991, he played on the entire Time Does Not Heal album, and soon after this, Dark Angel disbanded.

Discography
 Compilation - Metal Massacre VIII (1986)
 Viking - Do or Die (1988)
 Compilation - The Best of Metal Blade, Volume 3 (1988)
 Viking - Man of Straw (1989)
 Compilation - Metallic Overdrive (1990)
 Dark Angel - Live Scars (1990)
 Dark Angel - Time Does Not Heal (1991)

References

American heavy metal guitarists
Dark Angel (band) members
Year of birth missing (living people)
Living people
American male guitarists